"KOD" is a single by American rapper J. Cole, released on April 20, 2018 from his fifth studio album of the same name (2018), and was produced solely by himself. "KOD" was serviced to American mainstream urban radio, as the album's first single, on May 8, 2018.

Background
Each of J. Cole's last two albums contained no features, and in the first verse of "KOD", he addresses the fans and media. "How come you won't get a few features?" he raps on KOD. "I think you should, how 'bout I don't? How 'bout you just get the fuck off my dick? How 'bout you listen and never forget? Only gon' say this one time, then I'll dip, niggas ain't worthy to be on my shit."

Chart performance
Upon its first week of release, "KOD" debuted at number 10 on the US Billboard Hot 100. The song broke Spotify opening day record in the US, it was streamed 4.2 million times, Taylor Swift previously held the record for "Look What You Made Me Do" (2017).

In December 2018, Billboard ranked "KOD" as the 64th best song of the year.

Charts

Weekly charts

Year-end charts

Certifications

References

2018 songs
J. Cole songs
Songs written by J. Cole
Song recordings produced by J. Cole
2018 singles